Breasticles is the third studio album by Kristeen Young.

Track listing
All tracks composed by Kristeen Young
"We Want More!?" -
"Touch Tongues" - 
"Bite Down" -
"We Are The World (Why KY)" -
"Wake the Dead" -
"21st Century Ride" -
"Rock Radio" -
"Valuable" -
"Automatic Love" -
"Breasticles" -
"Incubator" -
"Saviour" -
"Flash" -
"Buddy Boy" -

Personnel

The Band 
Kristeen Young - vocals, piano, keyboards; guitar on "Flash"
Tony Visconti - bass, guitar
"Baby" Jeff White - drums
with:
Richard Fortus - guitar on "Touch Tongues" and "Saviour"
Brian Ion - bass noise on "We Are The World (Why KY)"
Oliver Hofer - bass on "Rock Radio" and "Flash"
Gregg Carey - drums on "Rock Radio" and "Flash"
David Bowie - vocals on "Saviour"
David Matos - guitar on "Flash"
Mario J. McNulty - engineer; drums on "21st Century Ride"

References

Kristeen Young albums
2003 albums
Albums produced by Tony Visconti